Quinn & Qristina Bachand are a brother-sister duo from Victoria, British Columbia, Canada. Qristina plays fiddle and sings; Quinn plays acoustic guitar, Irish tenor banjo, clawhammer banjo, bodhran, fiddle, electric guitar and sings. Since forming in 2007, they have become important names in the international Celtic music scene, performing across Canada, the US and in Europe at clubs, concert halls and music festivals. Qristina and Quinn have shared the stage with the likes of Ashley MacIsaac, Battlefield Band, Lau, Lunasa, Liz Carroll & John Doyle, Natalie MacMaster, and The Barra MacNeils.

Discography
Relative Minors (2008)
Family (2011)
Little Hinges (2015)

Awards

|-
| 2015
| Little Hinges (album)
| Western Canadian Music Awards (Roots Duo/Group Recording of the Year)
| 
|-
| 2013
| Family (album)
| Vancouver Island Music Awards  (Roots Recording of the Year)
| 
|-
| 2012
| Family (album)
| Western Canadian Music Awards  (World Recording of the Year)
| 
|-
| 2011
| Qristina & Quinn Bachand
| Irish Music Awards (Top Duo in Festival, Pub & Concert)
| 
|-
| 2011
| Family (album)
| Canadian Folk Music Awards (Instrumental Group of the Year)
| 
|-
| 2011
| Family (album)
| Canadian Folk Music Awards (Young Performer of the Year)
| 
|-
| 2010
| Qristina & Quinn Bachand
| Irish Music Awards (Top Traditional Group in Festival, Pub & Concert)
| 
|-
| 2010
| Qristina & Quinn Bachand
| Irish Music Awards (Best New Irish Music Artist)
| 
|-
| 2009
| Relative Minors (album)
| Canadian Folk Music Awards  (Young Performer of the Year)
| 
|}

Radio

Qristina and Quinn have been featured on Canadian, US and international radio and television programs including ABC, BBC, CBC, CTV, Folk Alley, Global, NBC and NPR. NPR’s “Celtic Connections” named Family as its 2011 Album of the Year.

References

External links
 Official website

Canadian Celtic music groups
Canadian indie folk groups
Musical groups from Victoria, British Columbia
Musical groups established in 2007
2007 establishments in British Columbia